Ballia Assembly constituency was an assembly constituency in Begusarai district in the Indian state of Bihar.

As a consequence of the orders of the Delimitation Commission of India, Ballia Assembly constituency ceased to exist in 2010.

It was a part of Balia Lok Sabha constituency.
This assembly region is now a part of new Sahebpur Kamal Assembly.

Ballia Assembly constituency comprised Ballia (Begusarai) and Sahebpur Kamal Blocks.

Results

1977-2010
In the October 2010 Bihar Assembly elections, Shreenarayan Yadav of Rashtriya Janata Dal won the Ballia seat defeating his nearest rival Jamshed Ashraf of Janata Dal United. Shri. Shreenarayan Yadav has won this constituency 9 times. Only winners and runners are being mentioned. Shreenarayan Yadav of RJD defeated Jamshed Ashraf of LJP in October 2005 and in February 2005, Md. Tanweer Hasan of JD(U) in 2000, Krishna Mohan Yadav of Independent in 1995, Samsu Joha of Congress in 1990, Samsu Joha of Congress in 1985, Chandrabhanu Devi of Congress (I) in 1980 and Ram Lakhan Yadav of Congress in 1977.

Member of Legislative Assembly (MLA)
Shri. Shreenarayan Yadav has won this constituency 9 times on 3 different party tickets.

References

Former assembly constituencies of Bihar
Politics of Begusarai district